The Northcoast Marine Mammal Center (NMMC) is a non-profit organization dedicated to the rescue and rehabilitation of stranded, sick or injured seals, sea lions, dolphins, porpoises, and whales along the northernmost coast of California. The Northcoast Marine Mammal Center is funded by donations and grants and has a large volunteer force which allows it to accomplish its mission. The Northcoast Marine Mammal Center is located in Crescent City, California and has operations that cover over 200 miles of rugged coastline.

NMMC was founded in 1984 by Dennis Wood, a California veterinarian.

Board and staff
Karen Helms - Executive Director
Dennis Wood - DVM; Board Member, Veterinarian, Founder
Christopher Callahan - Board Member
Lee Barnhill - Board Member
Amanda Hooper - Board Member

References

External links
 Official Northcoast Marine Mammal Center website

Marine mammal rehabilitation and conservation centers
Animal welfare organizations based in the United States
Buildings and structures in Del Norte County, California
Environmental organizations based in California
Environmental organizations established in 1984
1984 establishments in California